The 1975 Northwestern Wildcats team represented Northwestern University during the 1975 Big Ten Conference football season. In their third year under head coach John Pont, the Wildcats compiled a 3–8 record (2–6 against Big Ten Conference opponents) and finished in ninth place in the Big Ten Conference.

The team's offensive leaders were quarterback Randy Dean with 1,315 passing yards, Greg Boykin with 1,105 rushing yards, and Scott Yelvington with 686 receiving yards. Three Northwestern players received All-Big Ten honors: (1) defensive back Pete Shaw (AP-1; UPI-1); (2) center Paul Jasinskis (AP-1; UPI-2); and (3) wide receiver Scott Yelvington (UPI-2).

Schedule

Roster

References

Northwestern
Northwestern Wildcats football seasons
Northwestern Wildcats football